Miroslav Šmíd is a former international speedway rider from Czechoslovakia.

Speedway career 
Šmíd won a silver medal at the Speedway World Team Cup in the 1963 Speedway World Team Cup.

World final appearances

World Team Cup
 1963 -  Vienna, Stadion Wien (with Stanislav Kubíček / Luboš Tomíček Sr. / Antonín Kasper Sr. - 2nd - 27pts (5)

References 

Czech speedway riders
Living people
Year of birth missing (living people)